The Open Access in Data Transmission Act is an internet and telecommunications law bill filed in the Congress of the Philippines. The bill contains provisions encouraging the development of data transmission infrastructure and removing any barrier to competition in data transmission services. It also aims to protect and promote the internet as an open platform enabling consumer choice, freedom of expression, end-user control, competition and freedom to innovate without permission.

Background
The Philippine telecommunications industry was liberalized in 1995 with the passage of the Republic Act No. 7925 or the Public Telecommunications Policy Act. Prior to the enactment of the law, the telecommunications industry was heavily dominated by the Philippine Long Distance Telephone Company (PLDT). On March 29, 1994, Internet first became available and has since become commercially available for consumer, private business, government and institutional use.

Business process outsourcing in the Philippines (BPO) started in 1997. Significant number of BPO companies depend on internet connectivity to perform its function. Revenues from this new industry has since contributed significant percentage to the Philippines' Gross Domestic Product. With the industry becoming competitive locally, many industry players offered remote work opportunities, taking advantage of the advancement of technology such as videotelephony, virtual private network, and remote desktop software. On December 20, 2018, Republic Act No. 11165 or the Telecommuting Act was enacted, setting a state policy on remote work and flexible work arrangements.

During the COVID-19 pandemic, many businesses, organizations, government and academic institutions were forced to close and switch to remote work as a contingency plan. Much of the local home data and mobile telecommunications infrastructure went on high demand that resulted to slow data transmission. Despite the passage of Republic Act No. 11494 on September 14, 2020, or the Bayanihan to Recover as One Act, to facilitate a streamed lined process of approving local and national government permits to build telecommunications infrastructure, many observed that there is not much competition in the telecommunication sector as there is no enabling law that prohibits public telecommunication entities (PTE)s of bandwidth throttling, state oversight on PTEs performance on data transmission, among others.

Support
In a statement from Department of Information and Communications Technology through Secretary Gringo Honasan on March 20, 2021, the DICT expressed its support for the bill. He added that the DICT supports any policies aimed at spurring the growth of information and communications technology in the country.

The Philippine Chamber of Commerce and Industry also expressed its support for the bill. They stated that if the bill is enacted to a law, it lowers barriers to market entry, fast-track and lower the cost of deploying broadband facilities, and make more spectrum available for Internet service.

Several foreign chambers of commerce, as well as the Management Association of the Philippines (MAP), Philippine Association of Multinational Companies Regional Headquarters, Semiconductor and Electronics Industries in the Philippines Incorporated (SEIPI) also expressed support for the measure. They stated that developing competitive digital infrastructure would be essential for better lives for everyone in the Philippines and critical for local and foreign investments.

Legislative history

House
House representative Victor Yap of Tarlac 2nd district filed House Bill No. 00057 on July 1, 2019. This was followed by Francis Gerald Abaya of Cavite 1st district on August 22, 2019, with House Bill No. 04109, Johnny Pimentel of Surigao del Sur 2nd district on November 12, 2019, with House Bill No. 05341 and Joy Tambunting of Parañaque 2nd district on January 18, 2021, with House Bill No. 08383. House Bill No. 08910 was introduced as a substitute bill of the 4 prior bills by the House Committee on Information and Communications Technology on March 5, 2021, and approved by the same committee on March 9, 2021.

After series of interpellations and amendments in the House plenary, the bill passed on second reading on March 16, 2021. On July 28, 2021, with 200 affirmative and no negative votes, the bill passed on third and final reading.

Senate
On July 29, 2021, the bill was transmitted to the Senate for action. Senate Bill No. 45 was filed by Senate President Pro Tempore Ralph Recto and Grace Poe, while  Senate Bill No. 911, was filed by Senator Ramon Bong Revilla Jr. Its Economic Planning Office only conducted a webinar on the said measure on July 7, 2021. The Senate Committee on Science and Technology chaired by Senator Nancy Binay is yet to take action on the measure.

References

External links
 House Bill No. 08910: Open Access in Data Transmission Act 
 Senate Bill No. 45: Open Access in Data Transmission Act 

Internet in the Philippines
Information technology in the Philippines
Telecommunications in the Philippines
Computer law
Telecommunications law
Telecommunications policy